When the Wife's Away is a 1926 American silent domestic comedy film directed by Frank R. Strayer and starring George K. Arthur and Dorothy Revier. Written by Douglas Bronston, it was released by Columbia Pictures on October 26, 1926.

Cast list
 George K. Arthur as Billy Winthrop
 Dorothy Revier as Ethel Winthrop
 Bobby Dunn as Uncle Hiram
 Ned Sparks 
 Harry Depp
 Lincoln Plummer 
 Tom Ricketts 
 Ina Rorke

References

External links
 
 
 

Silent American comedy films
American silent feature films
Columbia Pictures films
Films directed by Frank R. Strayer
American black-and-white films
1926 comedy films
1926 films
1920s American films